Kelsey Airport  is a registered aerodrome located  east of Kelsey, Manitoba, Canada.

References

External links

Registered aerodromes in Manitoba